Manny K. De Los Santos (born January 30, 1979) is an American politician and social worker serving as a member of the New York State Assembly from the 72nd district. He assumed office on February 17, 2022.

Early life and education 
De Los Santos was born in the Dominican Republic and was raised in Washington Heights, Manhattan. He earned a Bachelor of Arts degree in psychology and a Master of Social Work from the University at Albany, SUNY.

Career 
De Los Santos began his career working for the Children's Aid Society as a school social worker. From 2011 to 2018, he was a social worker for Counseling in Schools. In 2018, he was the campaign manager for Congressman Adriano Espaillat's re-election campaign. He was also the assistant vice president of the Hamilton Campaign Network. From 2019 to 2022, he worked as vice president of MirRam Group for government relations. De Los Santos was elected to the New York State Assembly in a February 2022 special election.

References

External links 
Represent NYC Election Special: NYS Assembly District 72 Democratic Primary at Internet Archive

Living people
New York (state) Democrats
American politicians of Dominican Republic descent
Dominican Republic emigrants to the United States
Hispanic and Latino American state legislators in New York (state)
American social workers
People from Washington Heights, Manhattan
University at Albany, SUNY alumni
1979 births